Statham is a city in Barrow County, Georgia, United States. The population was 2,408 at the 2010 census.

History
The community was named after Charles Statham, a University of Georgia official.

Geography

Demographics

2020 census

As of the 2020 United States census, there were 2,813 people, 895 households, and 658 families residing in the city.

2000 census
As of the census of 2000, there were 2,040 people, 731 households, and 551 families residing in the city. The racial makeup of the city was 82.35% White, 14.66% Black, 0.69% Native American, 0.49% Asian, 0.05% Pacific Islander, 0.83% from other races, and 0.93% from two or more races. Hispanic or Latino of any race were 2.30% of the population.

There were 731 households, out of which 38.7% had children under the age of 18 living with them, 56.4% were married couples living together, 14.4% had a female householder with no husband present, and 24.6% were non-families. 20.1% of all households were made up of individuals, and 7.9% had someone living alone who was 65 years of age or older.  The average household size was 2.73 and the average family size was 3.13.

In the city, the population was spread out, with 27.7% under the age of 18, 8.9% from 18 to 24, 33.1% from 25 to 44, 18.8% from 45 to 64, and 11.4% who were 65 years of age or older.  The median age was 32 years. For every 100 females, there were 94.1 males.  For every 100 females age 18 and over, there were 88.5 males.

The median income for a household in the city was $40,111, and the median income for a family was $40,882. Males had a median income of $31,957 versus $21,995 for females. The per capita income for the city was $15,783.  About 10.4% of families and 12.7% of the population were below the poverty line, including 13.9% of those under age 18 and 27.4% of those age 65 or over.

Notable people from Statham
Julius Thompson, teacher and novelist.
Michael D. Steele, retired United States Army Colonel.

References

External links
City of Statham official website
Statham House historical marker
Statham High School historical marker

Cities in Georgia (U.S. state)
Cities in Barrow County, Georgia